John Joseph McIntyre (born August 20, 1963) is an American prelate of the Roman Catholic Church, serving as an auxiliary bishop of the Archdiocese of Philadelphia since 2010.

Biography

Early life and education
John McIntyre was born on August 20, 1963, in the Germantown section of Philadelphia, Pennsylvania, one of three sons of Thomas and Blanche (née Ferrero) McIntyre. He received his early education at St. Basil Elementary School of the Ukrainian Archeparchy in Philadelphia. McIntyre attended Father Judge High School in Philadelphia for three years before entering St. Mary's High School Seminary in Erie, Pennsylvania, to study for the Congregation of the Most Holy Redeemer (Redemptorists).

McIntyre then attended St. Alphonsus Seminary in Suffield, Connecticut, where he earned a Bachelor of Philosophy degree in 1986. From 1986 to 1987, he continued his studies at the Redemptorist House of Studies and the Washington Theological Union. He taught at St. Benedict Elementary School in Philadelphia for two years before entering St. Charles Borromeo Seminary in Overbrook in 1989. McIntyre earned a Master of Divinity degree in 1991.

Ordination and ministry
McIntyre was ordained to the priesthood for the Archdiocese of Philadelphia by Cardinal Anthony Bevilacqua on May 16, 1992. His first assignment was as a parochial vicar at St. Dominic Parish in Philadelphia, where he remained for three years. He then served at St. Mark Parish in Bristol, Pennsylvania, from 1995 to 1999. He also served as a member of the Council of Priests (1996–99) and of the admissions board for St. Charles Borromeo Seminary (1997–99). Since 1999, McIntyre has been secretary to the archbishop, serving Cardinals Bevilacqua (1999-2003) and Justin Rigali (2003-2010).

McIntyre was named by the Vatican as a chaplain to his holiness in 2003, and elevated to the rank of prelate of honor in 2005. In addition to his duties as secretary to the archbishop, he served as chaplain at the motherhouse of the Sisters of Mercy in Merion, Pennsylvania, from 1999 to 2003.

Auxiliary Bishop of Philadelphia
On June 8, 2010, McIntyre was appointed auxiliary bishop of Philadelphia and titular bishop of Bononia by Pope Benedict XVI. He received his episcopal consecration on August 6, 2010, from Cardinal Rigali at the Cathedral Basilica of SS. Peter and Paul in Philadelphia.  As an auxiliary bishop, McIntyre serves as archdiocesan director of the Secretariat for Evangelization.

See also

 Catholic Church hierarchy
 Catholic Church in the United States
 Historical list of the Catholic bishops of the United States
 List of Catholic bishops of the United States
 Lists of patriarchs, archbishops, and bishops

References

External links
 Roman Catholic Archdiocese of Philadelphia Official Website
 Office of Catholic Education

Episcopal succession

 

1963 births
Living people
Clergy from Philadelphia
21st-century American Roman Catholic titular bishops
Washington Theological Union alumni
St. Charles Borromeo Seminary alumni